The ninth and final season of Matlock originally aired in the United States on ABC with a two hour season premiere from October 13, 1994 and a two hour series finale on  May 7, 1995.

Cast

Main 
 Andy Griffith as Ben Matlock
 Daniel Roebuck as Cliff Lewis
 Carol Huston as Jerri Stone

Recurring 
 David Froman as Lt. Bob Brooks
 Julie Sommars as ADA Julie March

Cast notes
 Carol Huston joined the cast this season
 Daniel Roebuck and Carol Huston both missed one episode.
 It was unclear if the show would be renewed for a tenth season, so the show-runners produced an unofficial final episode, "The Assault", and it aired slightly earlier than the remaining episodes of the season in production order. After it became certain that Season 9 would indeed be the final season of Matlock, "The Assault" would be moved to air after the last aired episode in season 9 in syndication and serve as the effective conclusion to the series.

Episodes

References

External links 
 

1994 American television seasons
1995 American television seasons
09